Gegenbauer is a German surname. Notable people with the surname include:

Josef Anton Gegenbauer (1800–1876), German historical and portrait painter
Leopold Gegenbauer (1849–1903), Austrian mathematician

See also
Karl Gegenbaur (1826–1903), German anatomist and professor
Gegenbauer polynomials, in mathematics

German-language surnames